Zębowo may refer to the following places:
Zębowo, Greater Poland Voivodeship (west-central Poland)
Zębowo, Kuyavian-Pomeranian Voivodeship (north-central Poland)
Zębowo, Pomeranian Voivodeship (north Poland)